Fridalen Church is a parish church of the Church of Norway in Bergen Municipality in Vestland county, Norway. It is located in the Fridalen neighborhood in the borough of Årstad in the city of Bergen. It is the church for the Fridalen parish which is part of the Bergensdalen prosti (deanery) in the Diocese of Bjørgvin. The white, stone church was built in a rectangular style in 1937 using designs by the architect Peter Andersen. The church seats about 450 people.

History
Construction on the new Fridalen Church took place in 1936-1937, just before the outbreak of World War II. The building was designed by Peter Andersen. It is built of plastered and whitewashed masonry and has a rectangular floor plan with a nave in the north and a choir in the south. The new building was consecrated on 6 May 1937. In 1952–1962, the choir area was enlarged, including a new sacristy and office area.

See also
List of churches in Bjørgvin

References

Churches in Bergen
Rectangular churches in Norway
Stone churches in Norway
20th-century Church of Norway church buildings
Churches completed in 1937
1937 establishments in Norway